Forbidden Siren 2 is a survival horror stealth game developed by Japan Studio's Project Siren team and published by Sony Computer Entertainment for the PlayStation 2 in 2006. It is a sequel to 2003's Siren (Forbidden Siren). A film inspired by the game but featuring a different plot and characters, Siren, was released that same year.

The game tells the story of several characters who become trapped on Yamijima Island, off the coast of mainland Japan. In 1976, during a blackout, the entire population of the island disappeared without a trace or explanation. Twenty-nine years later, in 2005, a journalist is visiting the island to conduct research for an article when the ferry he and a small group of other passengers are on capsizes. Shortly after this, a group of soldiers crash land on the island. The game is played from the perspective of these characters, and out of chronological order, as the protagonists attempt to survive the island's monsters and discover its mystery.

Gameplay
Like its predecessor, Forbidden Siren 2 is divided into numerous scenarios, organized chronologically in a table called the "Link Navigator". In order to complete a scenario, the player must accomplish a primary mission objective that usually involves reaching an exit point, finding an item, or subduing certain enemies (called  and the ). Objectives are interconnected via a butterfly effect, and a character's actions in one scenario can trigger a secondary objective in another.

The game's defining feature is "sightjacking," to see and hear from the perspectives of nearby shibito, yamibito, humans, and other creatures. The process is similar to tuning into a radio frequency, with the left analog stick serving as the dial. The clarity of each target depends on the distance from the player, and the direction of the dial depends on the target's orientation to the player. Once a signal is found, it can be assigned to one of the controller's four face buttons to switch between signals. Via sightjacking, the player can discover a shibito's position, patrol route, locations and items of interest. However, the player is unable to move while sightjacking and is vulnerable to attack. In Forbidden Siren 2, the sightjack system was altered to allow automatic sightjacking to the closest enemy without having to tune into its frequency. Character-specific features have been added, such as Shu's ability to move while sightjacking, Ikuko's ability to control sightjacked enemies, and Akiko's ability to reveal psychic impressions from the past when sightjacking in certain areas.

Also added is the ability to crouch-walk, a proximity alert that warns the player of nearby enemies, a hint system that guides the player to the current mission objective, three selectable difficulty levels, and an optional first-person mode. Context-sensitive interactions now require only a single button press rather, and bringing up the menu for common interactions no longer pauses the game. Important items remain in the inventory if a player is killed instead of needing to be reattained. The combat system has also been overhauled; characters can now use a three-hit combo attack and attack barehanded. Guns can be used as melee weapons, and there are many more weapons available.

The sequel also introduces a new enemy type - the yamibito, who are more resilient, aggressive, and intelligent. They are repelled by light, and can be weakened by a flashlight or turning on the lights in a room. Like the shibito, a yamibito can be defeated, but is revived when a  re-enters the corpse. Eliminating the yamirei (who are also intolerant to light) renders the yamibito unconscious indefinitely, but yamibito will not fall for distractions that may work on shibito, and are much harder to defeat in combat.

As in the original, items scattered through scenarios give the player insight into the story. Once obtained, these items are collected in a catalog called "Archives" and can be viewed at any time. The catalog has been expanded to include additional media types such as audio, video, and other interactive supplements.

Plot

Millennia ago, Mother was an ancient water deity who was imprisoned below the earth upon the creation of light. Mother's mate, Otoshigo, fled to the depths of the ocean. Over time, Mother has been determined to return to the surface, and has sent out avatars (possessed human beings whom she controls) to prepare for her return. However, they continually fail their mission, and never return to the Underworld.

In 1976, an underwater cable was cut, and all power to Yamijima Island was lost and four-year-old Shu Mikami finds a young woman washed up on the shore. The woman, Kanae, bears an extraordinary resemblance to Shu's dead mother. The two become inseparable and as Kanae moves in with Shu and his father. The Yamijima locals fear her because of her aversion to sunlight. Kanae is actually an avatar of Mother, tasked with manipulating Shu into opening the seven gates of the Underworld, which are located on Yamijima Island, and keep Mother imprisoned. Before Kanae can complete her mission, Tsuneo Ohta, the head of a group of fishermen, determines she must be killed.

On a stormy night, Shu is awoken by the villagers, who have caught Kanae killing his father. Shu discovers the body but flees when he sees a man in the doorway of the house – the man is in fact his older self. Kanae escapes the villagers and reunites with Shu. Trapped by the group on the pier, the stone walkway gives out beneath them and they fall into the ocean. Shu swims to a small boat, but watches Kanae drown; the experience so traumatic that he goes blind. Meanwhile, Mother sends a tsunami to destroy the villagers in revenge. Local authorities can't explain how Yamijima's undersea power cable was severed, or how the entire population of the island disappeared.

In 2005, Ryuko Tagawa has been sent to earth as another avatar. She finds living as a human so comfortable that she forgets her original purpose and settles into a normal life. Meanwhile, Yuri Kishida, an innocent young girl, is kidnapped by Mother and hidden in a warehouse in Sanzu Harbor. Mother creates another avatar using Yuri's identity, and sends her to visit Ryuko, killing her for failing in her mission. Yuri then heads to Sanzu Harbour to watch the departure of the protagonists for Yamijima Island, as Mother knows that the person who will release her is among them.

At the harbor a grown Shu, Mamoru Itsuki, Soji Abe, Akiko Kiyota and Ikuko Kifune board a small boat heading for Yamijima Island. Mamoru wants to investigate the mystery of 1976 for a magazine article. Shu is returning to the island in an attempt to rediscover lost childhood memories. Soji has been accused of Ryuko's murder and, along with Akiko, is fleeing to the island. Ikuko is a dock worker on the boat as a deckhand, but finds herself drawn to the island. A large mass passes the boat unseen, the waves turn red, and a tsunami capsizes the vessel, splitting the passengers up.

A military helicopter carrying Private Yorito Nagai, Major Takeaki Misawa and Sergeant Hiroshi Okita crashes on Yamijima Island, killing Okita. Okita transforms into a shibito, forcing Yorito to shoot him. Already on the island is Shigeru Fujita, a police officer who has come to investigate reports of a young woman on the apparently deserted island. Also present is Ichiko Yagura, a young schoolgirl, who awakens on board the Bright Win, a ferry that has run aground. The ferry disappeared during a tsunami in 1986, but has inexplicably appeared in the present day, with Ichiko its only passenger. Meanwhile, the villagers who disappeared in 1976 have also reappeared on the island in the present day.

Awakening on the pier, Mamoru sets out to explore. He encounters a shibito, then meets Yuri, who tells him her mother is imprisoned "in the island", and she needs help to save her. They are accosted by Tomoe, who attacks Yuri, calling her a witch, and accusing her of being the same entity as Kanae. Mamoru and Yuri flee, then encounter Yorito and Takeaki, the soldiers. Yuri is afraid of them, and can't bear the light from their torches. As the group talk, a red tsunami appears and an earthquake rocks the island as a siren rings out.

Meanwhile, Shu awakens near his old house, which is unchanged from 1976. He enters to see his four-year-old self holding the body of his dead father. Tsuneo arrives, intending to kill Kanae, but Shu's father resurrects as a shibito and chases him. Elsewhere, Shigeru meets Ichiko, the girl from the ferry, and they run into Tsuneo, who transforms into a shibito and attacks them. He corners them in an ammo depot, but Ichiko smiles at him, causing him to panic and flee. Meanwhile, Tomoe is chased by a group of shibito, and falls down a ravine, fatally impaling herself on an antenna.

After surviving the tsunami, the soldiers Takeaki and Yorito board the Bright Win. Takeaki acts strangely, having taken some hallucinogenic medication, and Yorito leaves him. Elsewhere, Soji was separated from Akiko, but encounters Shu, and they head to an abandoned amusement park, where Shu believes he can rediscover his lost memories. Meanwhile, Yuri leads Mamoru to the same park, where she manipulates him into opening the seven gates to the Underworld. She then reveals her true form, Mother. Ikuko arrives and uses her psychic power to bring Mamoru back to his senses. Soji sees Mother as his murdered flatmate, Ryuko, whilst Shu sees Mother as Kanae. Unable to resist her call, Shu gives himself over to her and is enveloped.

Elsewhere on the island, Mother's siren sounds, signifying her release, prompting Ichiko to kill Shigeru. Back in the Underworld, Mother, now free from her prison, gives birth to hundreds of yamirei - albino slug-like creatures. Soji, Akiko, Ikuko and Mamoru flee, but Ikuko and Mamoru become trapped. As they are about to be killed, a group of shiryos (the spirits that animate the dead into shibito) pour down into the abyss and fight the yamirei, giving Ikuko and Mamoru the opportunity to escape. Back in the park, Ikuko destroys the seven gates, preventing the Underworld from releasing any more yamirei. Those already released become yamibito and begin converting the island's shibito. Mamoru and Ikuko escape through the amusement park and are surrounded by yamirei. But dawn breaks, and the light-sensitive yamirei are destroyed. Ikuko tells Mamoru they are both on their own now, and leaves.

Coming back to her senses, Ichiko is horrified to see Shigeru's corpse at her feet. She has a flashback of falling overboard the Bright Win and sinking to the bottom of the ocean. She was resurrected and possessed by Otoshigo, Mother's mate. Meanwhile, Shigeru is resurrected as a yamibito. Takeaki encounters Ichiko, and demands answers, Yorito appears, and fearing for Ichiko's life, shoots Takeaki in the back. Yorito leaves with Ichiko and they are attacked by a dog-like yamibito. Ichiko flees, and again becomes possessed by Otoshigo and mindlessly kills any yamibito she encounters. Yorito finds Ichiko's bracelet, and uses it to bring her back to her senses. Meanwhile, Mamoru boards the Bright Win to destroy as many yamibito as he can, knowing it was his fault they were released. He discovers that Tomoe has transformed into a dog yamibito roaming the ship.

Having fled the Underworld, Akiko notices a massive pylon reaching into the sky. She follows a psychic trail to where Shu and Kanae fell into the sea in 1976. Shu contacts Akiko from beyond the grave and asks her to save his father, Ryuhei, who has transformed into a kou-yamibito, a grotesque human/yamirei creature much stronger and more deadly than a normal yamibito. Shu leads her to a sacred tree branch which is traditionally used to keep evil spirits from the dead. Akiko finds a mysterious artifact, the Anunnaki Remains. Eventually, she destroys Ryuhei, stabbing him with the branch and freeing his soul. His body transforms into the Mekkoju tree. Akiko receives another vision – Ryuhei's murder. In the vision, Kanae flees, covered in Ryuhei's blood, but as she passes a mirror she sees Akiko's face. In the real world, Akiko collapses, and when she raises her head, she now looks and sounds like Kanae/Yuri. No longer able to resist Mother's power, she becomes another avatar.
  
Ikuko discovers the Anunnaki Remains lodged into the Mekkoju tree, now entwined in the tower. With it, she destroys Shigeru, who has turned into a kou-yamibito, freeing his soul. Meanwhile, on the Bright Win, Mamoru and Yorito and scale the tower. Mamoru believes their current reality is fake, a copy of the real world where time has folded back on itself. He believes the pylon reaches the point where two worlds intersect, and that is where Mother will pass from the fake reality into the real one. He and Yorito ascend the tower and obtain a Mekkoju branch for Tsuneo, now also a kou-yamibito. Tsuneo knocks Yorito off the tower, but Mamoru destroys him, also freeing his soul.

Having survived his fall, Yorito vows to destroy every yamirei and yamibito. He discovers the yamirei are living in an old school and destroys it with a flare gun. He kills and frees the soul of Okita, before being confronted by Takeaki, transformed into a kou-yamibito. Yorito defeats Takeaki, but Ichiko appears, her face swollen into a single eye. She transforms into Otoshigo and attacks Yorito. He destroys the creature, celebrating, as he believes the nightmare is over.

Back on the tower, Ikuko and Mamoru are reunited. Ikuko stabs Tomoe with the Mekkoju branch, freeing her soul. Mother scales the tower to reach the real world and the tower crumbles as the fake reality fractures. Mamoru and Ikuko are sucked into Mother's plane of existence. As they battle her, Akiko/Kanae appears, imploring for Shu's forgiveness. Akiko exerts control over her body, and kills herself by plunging the Annunaki Remains into her stomach, injuring Mother, and allowing Mamoru and Ikuko to destroy her. Another red tsunami washes over the island as the fake reality is replaced with the real one, and the timeline is purged. Lying together on the pier, Mamoru and Ikuko are bathed in sunlight as dawn breaks. Looking into the sun, Ikuko squints, as if the light hurts her eyes.

Soji is joined on the beach by Tsukasa, and together, they look out at the sun. With the purging of the timeline Soji's past has changed. In the wake of Mother's death, Ryuko Tagawa never existed, so Soji is no longer a wanted felon. Elsewhere, Yorito awakens on a dimly lit boulevard. He notices yamibito strolling past, casually going about everyday activity; one pushing a pram, one purchasing items from a stall, child yamibito playing. The sun is hidden beyond a permanent total eclipse. Unable to tell if what he is seeing is reality or an illusion, he screams and opens fire on the yamibito, gunning down many as they flee.

At the very end, Kyoya Suda, the protagonist of the first game, arrives on Yamijima Island with the Homuranagi sword and the Uryen, swearing he will destroy every monster still lurking on the island.

Development and release
The western release had both Japanese and English audio unlike the last game which only had English audio. The game was released on February 9, 2006, in Japan on the PlayStation 2. The game never received a North American release.

Reception

Forbidden Siren 2 received "average" reviews according to the review aggregation website Metacritic. Eurogamers Kristan Reed said that the game improved on many of the problems of the predecessor (especially the difficulty level and trial-and-error nature of the gameplay), but simultaneously fell somewhat short of the original. VideoGamer.com's Chris Pickering (a fan of Siren) also said that the game removed many of the problems inherent to the original but fell short in many respects. In Japan, Famitsu gave it a score of three nines and one eight for a total score of 35 out of 40.

Film
Siren (サイレン) is a film adaptation of Forbidden Siren 2. It was released in Japan on February 9, 2006, to coincide with the Japanese release of the game. Siren was directed by Yukihiko Tsutsumi and stars actors Yui Ichikawa, Leo Morimoto, Naoki Tanaka, Hiroshi Abe, Naomi Nishida, Suzuki Matsuo, Kyûsaku Shimada, Mai Takahashi, and Jun Nishiyama.

Notes

References

External links

  
 Forbidden Siren 2 at Hardcore Gaming 101
 
 

2006 video games
Fiction about deicide
Islands in fiction
Japan Self-Defense Forces in fiction
Oceans and seas in fiction
PlayStation 2 games
PlayStation 2-only games
Psychological horror games
Single-player video games
Siren (series) games
Stealth video games
Video games about police officers
Video games developed in Japan
Video games featuring female protagonists
Video games set in Japan
Video game sequels
Video games scored by Kuniaki Haishima
Video games set in 1976
Video games set in 2006
Video games set on uninhabited islands
Video games set on fictional islands